Spaces Everywhere is the twelfth studio album by English band The Monochrome Set. It was released on the 16th of March 2015, through German record label Tapete.

Background 

The album is the band's third studio album since re-forming in 2011 and their first release on Tapete Records.

Track listing

Critical reception 

On Metacritic, which assigns a "weighted average" rating out of 100 from selected independent ratings and reviews from mainstream critics, the album received a Metascore of 78 based on 11 reviews.
AllMusic said "The bulk of the album sounds like Television married Sparks and had a baby during London's swinging '60s and commented on the album's title track that as album closers go, it's a flute-filled, existential whopper and There really are spaces everywhere, and most would be better served if they were filled with Monochrome Set albums.

Personnel 
The Monochrome Set
 Bid – lead vocals, guitar, sleeve design
 John Paul Moran – keyboards
 Steve Brummell – drums, vocals
 Andrew Warren – bass guitar
 Lester Square – lead guitar
Technical
 Jon Clayton – production, engineering
 Timo Blunk - Mixing

References

External links 

 

The Monochrome Set albums
2015 albums
Tapete Records albums